James Carey was a United States Navy sailor and a recipient of America's highest military decoration — the Medal of Honor.

Biography
Carey was born in Ireland in either 1844 or 1847, depending on the source. He later served in the U.S. Navy, entering the service from New York City in 1866.

Medal of Honor citation
Rank and organization: Seaman, U.S. Navy. Born: 1844, Ireland. Accredited to: New York.

Citation:

Seaman on board the U.S.S. Huron, saving 3 shipmates from drowning.

See also

List of Medal of Honor recipients
List of Medal of Honor recipients in non-combat incidents

References

Irish-born Medal of Honor recipients
1840s births
19th-century Irish people
1913 deaths
United States Navy Medal of Honor recipients
United States Navy sailors
Irish emigrants to the United States (before 1923)
Non-combat recipients of the Medal of Honor
Burials at Holy Cross Cemetery, Brooklyn